Halite may refer to:

 Halite (mineral), the mineral form of sodium chloride
 Halite (oxyanion), an oxyanion that is the conjugate base of a halous acid